Al Andalus is a Libyan football club, currently playing in the Libyan Second Division.

The club hails from the historical city of Tobruk, in the far east of Libya. They play at Tobrok Stadium, which they share with their city rivals, Suqoor.

The club is managed by the Libyan manager, Muftah Mqairhy.

2015–16 season

Current squad
As of 24 November 2017

References

Football clubs in Libya
Tobruk